Colter Falls, also called Coulter Falls, is a waterfall on the Missouri River in north-central Montana, and part of the Great Falls of the Missouri. Downstream of Colter Falls lies Rainbow Falls, and upstream is Black Eagle Falls. The falls is now flooded in the impoundment behind Rainbow Dam. As Rainbow Dam's reservoir is a run-of-the-river reservoir, it rarely is emptied, so the falls are rarely seen even in extreme drought.

Discovery
The Lewis and Clark Expedition visited the falls, first describing the Westslope cutthroat trout at their base, but did not name them. They were named by Paris Gibson, founder of the city of Great Falls, Montana.

References

Landforms of Cascade County, Montana
Waterfalls of Montana
Block waterfalls